The Northern Forest is a proposed forest in England to encompass five community forests.  The aim is to plant 50 million trees by 2032 which would provide a timber industry, leisure opportunities and environmental benefits.  Initial funding for the project was granted by the British government in January 2018.

The proposed forest has been welcomed by the Woodland Trust.

Aims 
The proposed forest would run the whole width of England from Liverpool and Chester in the west to the coastline of the East Riding of Yorkshire and would include the cities of Manchester, Leeds, Sheffield and Hull.  The forest scheme is led by the Woodland Trust and would incorporate five community forests: the Mersey Forest, Manchester's City of Trees, the [White Rose Forest], the South Yorkshire Forest and Humber Forest. The aim is to plant 50 million trees in the 25 years between 2017 and 2042, a trebling of current planting rates in the area; this would help to increase the rate of reforestation in England, which is at record low rates and may currently be outweighed by the rate of deforestation for the first time in decades. The area currently has less than 8% tree coverage, one of the lowest proportions in the country.

The scheme was developed as an environmental counterpart to the government's Northern Powerhouse strategy. The trees proposed are a mix of native and non-native broad leaf trees and high-yield coniferous trees. The forest would seek to provide timber and biomass for industry as well as a leisure resource, reduce flood risk and improve air and water quality. It is hoped that a market for timber could be found in the biomass power stations in the M62 motorway corridor, which generate up to 10% of the UK's electricity and require up to 10 million tonnes of fuel per year.

The initial planting will be close to the cities, with an aim to increase coverage in this area to 20%.  The next priority would be river valleys where reforestation will help reduce flood risk.  The more remote portions would be planted towards the end of the 25-year programme.

Funding 
The cost of the project has been estimated at £500 million, whilst economic benefits are estimated at over £2.5 billion. The UK government granted initial funding of £5.7 million to the project in January 2018.

There is hope that mitigation funding from infrastructure projects such as the extension of the High Speed 2 rail scheme and major road schemes will be made available in the future. It is also hoped that there may be funding as agricultural subsidies are redirected after Brexit.

See also 
Great Northumberland Forest

References

Further reading

External links 

Woodland Trust

Forests and woodlands of England
Community-based forestry
Reforestation
Conservation in England
Northern England
2017 establishments in England
2017 in science